Lt. Col. The Hon. Neil McLean (1759 – September 3, 1832) was a judge and political figure in Upper Canada.

Biography
He was born in Scotland in 1759, descended from the Chiefs of Mingarry Castle on the Isle of Mull, and came to North America as a young man and ensign with the 84th Regiment of Foot (Royal Highland Emigrants) to fight in the American Revolution. After the war he was granted  and settled near Cornwall in Upper Canada. As a leading Presbyterian and a Highland gentleman and officer, McLean was a pre-eminent figure in the local community.

He served as sheriff in the Eastern District and, in 1788, was named judge in the surrogate court. He served in the Stormont militia during the War of 1812, becoming colonel. In 1815, he was appointed to the Legislative Council of Upper Canada but he never attended. He helped found the Highland Society of Canada in 1818. He died in St. Andrews in 1832.

He married Isabella, daughter of John MacDonell of Leek, cadets of the Clan MacDonell of Glengarry, being a descendant of the 7th Chief of Glengarry who died in 1645. MacDonell, who was wounded at the Battle of Culloden (1746), was one of the three brothers who helped form the Glengarry Fencibles under their Chief, Colonel Alexander Ranaldson MacDonell of Glengarry. Neil and Isabella's sons Archibald and Alexander were both members of the Legislative Assembly for the province and Archibald later became its chief justice.

References

1759 births
1832 deaths
Members of the Legislative Council of Upper Canada
Upper Canada judges